Harrison Island is a northern Canadian uninhabited island in eastern Hudson Bay.

Islands of Hudson Bay
Uninhabited islands of Qikiqtaaluk Region